The Indian Science Writers' Association (ISWA) was established on April-14, 1985 to develop and nurture the science writing and science communication professions in India. It has more than three hundred members and nine chapters in various Indian states.

External links 
 

1985 establishments in Delhi
Organizations established in 1985
Publishing-related professional associations
Organisations based in Delhi